WISE J2000+3629 (full designation is WISE J200050.19+362950.1) in astronomy is a nearby brown dwarf with a temperature less than 700 Kelvin (spectral type T8), located in the constellation Cygnus. Estimates suggest it is 12.7–26.1 light-years from Earth, making it one of the nearest known brown dwarfs to the Sun. It was discovered in 2014.

Discovery
WISE J2000+3629 was discovered in 2014 by Michael Cushing et al using the Wide-field Infrared Survey Explorer telescope.

References

Notes

Cygnus (constellation)
Brown dwarfs
T-type stars
WISE objects
20140206